Anzhelika Kotyuga (born 26 May 1970) is a Belarusian speed skater. She competed at the 1998 Winter Olympics and the 2002 Winter Olympics.

References

1970 births
Living people
Belarusian female speed skaters
Olympic speed skaters of Belarus
Speed skaters at the 1998 Winter Olympics
Speed skaters at the 2002 Winter Olympics
Sportspeople from Minsk